Hadoti  is a region of Rajasthan state in western India, which was once called the Bundi Kingdom. The biggest cities are Jhalawar and Kota. It includes the districts of Bundi, Baran, Jhalawar and Kota and is bounded on the west by the Mewar, on the northwest by Ajmer regions of Rajasthan, and on the south by the Malwa, on the east by the Gird regions of Madhya Pradesh state.

Geography
The region of south eastern Rajasthan lies between Malwa Plateau in the east, Aravali range in the west and Marwar plateau in the west south side, on the border with Madhya Pradesh. The major river is the Chambal River, with its tributaries Kaalisindh, Parvati, Parwan and Chapi. The soil is alluvial.

Princely states of Hadoti
 Palaitha - Hada Chauhan Maharaja's
 Moondli - Hada Maharaja's
 Kunadi - 
 Bamulia - Hada Maharaja's
 Kachnoada - Hada 
 Rajgarh - Hada 
 Ghati - Hada 
 Kherli - Tanwar
 Srinal - Tanwar
 Koela - Hada Chauhan
 Dabri - Hada 
 Kherli - Hada Maharaja's
 Karwar - Hada 
 Phasud - Hada 
 Pipalda - Hada 
 Antarda - Hada 
 Nimola - Hada 
 Sarola - Pandit Brahmins
Harnawada - Sirohiya Rao Raja
AKAWAD KHURD - RATHORE

Demographics

Religion

The vast majority of the population are Hindu. Muslims form the largest minority and are largely concentrated in urban areas.

Languages

Hadauti is the main language spoken in the region. Hindi is popular in urban areas like Kota. Malvi and Sondwari, a distinct dialect of Malwi, is spoken in the southern and western parts of Jhalawar along with Hindi.

See also 
Kota, Rajasthan
Kota limestone
Limestone

References

Regions of Rajasthan